Mitch Altman (born December 22, 1956) is a Berlin-based hacker and inventor, best known for inventing TV-B-Gone, as featured speaker at hacker conferences, as international expert on the hackerspace movement, and for teaching introductory electronics workshops. He is also Chief Scientist and CEO of Cornfield Electronics.

Early life and education
Altman grew up in Rogers Park, Chicago, Illinois. After kindergarten his family moved to Highland Park, Illinois. Altman graduated from Deerfield High School (Illinois) in 1975.
Altman is an alumnus of the University of Illinois at Urbana–Champaign, where he earned an undergraduate degree (1980) and a master's degree (1984) in electrical engineering. While at the University of Illinois, Altman co-organized the first Hash Wednesday in Champaign-Urbana in 1977.
Altman moved to the San Francisco Bay Area in 1986 to work in Silicon Valley.

VPL Research, 3ware, Cornfield Electronics, Maker Faire
Altman was an early developer of Virtual Reality technologies, working at VPL Research with Jaron Lanier. In addition to Lanier, Altman worked alongside about 15 other individuals. Altman left VPL Research in protest when it accepted contracts with the United States Department of Defense.

Altman co-founded Silicon Valley start-up 3ware in February 1997 with J. Peter Herz and Jim MacDonald (who is on the advisory board of Cornfield Electronics).

Altman started Cornfield Electronics as a consulting company. After the launch of TV-B-Gone Altman gave the company the tagline "We make Useful Electronics for a Better World".

Following extensive involvement in the "Maker" movement and Make magazine, including being featured in a Make magazine April Fool's Day prank, Altman publicly parted ways with the Maker Faire in 2012 after the Maker Faire accepted contracts with the United States Department of Defense.

TV-B-Gone

In 2004 Altman released a one-button universal remote control called TV-B-Gone, to be used for turning off TVs in public places. Altman used money from the sale of 3ware to pay for the manufacture of the first 20,000 units of TV-B-Gone. By February 2014, he was reported to have sold more than 500,000 units. He is currently selling the TV-B-Gone generation 4. He also invented a new product called the TV-B-Gone SHP (Super High Power).

Other activities

Mitch Altman is an important figure in the international "hackerspace" and "maker" movements. While attending the 2007 Berlin Chaos Communication Camp, Altman and Jacob Appelbaum began discussing the idea of a San Francisco hackerspace, at which time there were no hackerspaces in the United States.  In October 2008 he co-founded Noisebridge, which was probably the third hackerspace formed in the US.  Since then, Altman has traveled extensively, encouraging the formation of hackerspaces, holding panels and workshops on depression, teaching introductory electronics workshops to people of all ages and visiting electronics enthusiast groups around the world. TedX Brussels invited Altman to give a Ted Talk the Hackerspace movement, Make magazine has referred to Altman as "the Johnny Appleseed of hackerspaces", and Altman, who 
has also written for the magazine, was awarded the first "Maker Hero" award—named in his honor—by Make Magazine on May 20, 2011.

In September 2018, Altman announced that he had left Noisebridge.

References

External links

 Audio of a talk given by Altman and Lady Ada on July 23, 2006 at HOPE Number Six
 TV-B-Gone talk, Hack Your Life For Fun & Profit
 Geeks & Depression panel at 28C3 hacker conference
 TEDxBrussels talk on The Hackerspace Movement
 TV-B-Gone at Cornfield Electronics, Inc.
 Mitch Altman on Reddit, July 29th, 2012

Living people
21st-century American inventors
Engineers from California
American chief executives
1956 births
Grainger College of Engineering alumni